Cristian Martín Villero (born 21 January 1998) is a Uruguayan footballer who plays as a forward for River Plate in the Uruguayan Primera División.

Career

River Plate
A graduate of the club's youth academy, Martín made his professional debut for the club on 4 June 2017, coming on as a halftime substitute for Mathías Saavedra in a 2–0 defeat to Sud América.

Career statistics

Club

References

External links
Cristian Martín at playmakerstats.com (English version of ogol.com.br)

1998 births
Living people
Club Atlético River Plate (Montevideo) players
Tacuarembó F.C. players
Uruguayan Primera División players
Uruguayan Segunda División players
Uruguayan footballers
Association football forwards